Yevheniy Ruslanovych Ryazantsev (born 28 January 2002) is a Ukrainian professional footballer who plays as a right winger for Metalist Kharkiv.

References

External links
 Profile on Metalist Kharkiv official website

2002 births
Living people
Footballers from Kyiv
Ukrainian Second League players
Ukrainian First League players
FC Olympik Kharkiv players
FC Metalist Kharkiv players
Association football forwards
Ukrainian footballers
Ukraine youth international footballers